The 1975 WHA Amateur Draft was the third draft held by the World Hockey Association.


Selections by Round
Below are listed the selections in the 1975 WHA Amateur Draft.

Round 1

Round 2

Round 3

Round 4

Round 5

Round 6

Round 7

Round 8

Round 9

Round 10

Round 11

Round 12

Round 13

Round 14

See also
1975 NHL Amateur Draft
1975–76 WHA season

References
1975 WHA Amateur Draft on Hockeydb.com

WHA Amateur Drafts
Draft